From the Vault or From the Vaults may refer to:

 From The Vault, a melodycore band from Bielefeld, Germany 
 From the Vault (Magic: The Gathering), a series of limited-edition card sets for the Magic: the Gathering trading-card game
 From the Vaults (Nazareth album), an album released by hard rock band Nazareth in 1993
 From the Vault (Spock's Beard album), an album released by progressive rock band Spock's Beard in 1997
 From the Vaults (The Beau Brummels album), an album released by rock band The Beau Brummels in 1982

See also
 SHT: From The Vault EP, a digital EP released by electro-pop duo 3OH!3 in 2012
 Stories from the Vaults, a behind-the-scenes series focusing on the Smithsonian Institution
 Tales from the Vault, a Doctor Who audio drama by Big Finish Productions
 View from the Vault, a four-part series of live DVDs and companion soundtracks by the Grateful Dead